Mohamed Mamdouh (born May 24, 1993) is an Egyptian professional footballer who currently plays as a right back for the Egyptian club El Raja SC. In 2014, he signed a 3-year contract for El Gouna FC from El Sharkia Dokhan in a 220,000 Egyptian pound transfer.

References

External links
 

1993 births
Living people
El Raja SC players
Egyptian footballers
Association football defenders